may refer to:

 Keikyū Haneda Station (1913–1915), now Anamori-inari Station
 Tokyo Monorail Haneda Station (1964–1998), now Tenkūbashi Station
 Keikyū Haneda Station (1993–1998), now Tenkūbashi Station

See also 
 Haneda Airport Station (disambiguation)
 Haneda Airport Domestic Terminal Station / Haneda Airport Terminal 1 Station / Haneda Airport Terminal 2 Station
 Haneda Airport International Terminal Station